The 2002–2003 LEB season was the 7th season of the Liga Española de Baloncesto, second tier of the Spanish basketball.

LEB standings

LEB Oro Playoffs
The two winners of the semifinals are promoted to Liga ACB.

Relegation playoffs

CB Ciudad de Huelva and Ulla Oil Rosalía, relegated to LEB-2.

TV coverage
TVE2
Teledeporte

See also 
Liga Española de Baloncesto

External links
All scores on FEB.es

LEB Oro seasons
LEB2
Second level Spanish basketball league seasons